Bloom is Lou Rhodes' second solo album, released in 2007.

Opening track "The Rain" was released as a single, backed with "Gabriel", an acoustic version of the song by Rhodes' former band Lamb, and "Satellite", a cover version of Elliott Smith's song from his second album.

The album was positively received by the BBC and WalesOnline.

Track listing
 "The Rain"
 "Greatness in a Speck of Dust"
 "Icarus"
 "Never Loved a Man (Like You)"
 "All We Are"
 "Chase All My Winters Away"
 "This Love"
 "They Say"
 "Sister Moon"
 "Bloom"

References

External links
 Infinite Bloom (Lou's record label)

2007 albums
Lou Rhodes albums